In Navajo culture, a skin-walker is a type of harmful witch who has the ability to turn into, possess, or disguise themselves as an animal.

Background

In the Navajo language,  translates to "by means of it, it goes on all fours".

Navajo witches, including skin-walkers, represent the antithesis of Navajo cultural values. While community healers and cultural workers are known as medicine men and women, or by other positive, nurturing terms in the local, indigenous language, witches are seen as evil, performing twisted ceremonies and manipulating magic in a perversion of the good works medicine people traditionally perform. In order to practice their good works, traditional healers learn about both good and evil magic. Most can handle the responsibility, but some people can become corrupt and choose to become witches.

The legend of the skin-walkers is not well understood outside of Navajo culture, both due to reluctance to discuss the subject with outsiders, as well as those from outside the culture lacking the lived experience Native commentators feel is needed to understand the lore. Traditional Navajo people are reluctant to reveal skin-walker lore to non-Navajos, or to discuss it at all among those they do not trust. Adrienne Keene, Cherokee Nation activist and founder of the blog Native Appropriations, has written in response to non-Navajos incorporating the legends into their writing (and specifically the impact when J. K. Rowling did so) that when this is done, "we as Native people are now opened up to a barrage of questions about these beliefs and traditions...but these are not things that need or should be discussed by outsiders. At all. I'm sorry if that seems 'unfair', but that's how our cultures survive."

Legend
Animals associated with witchcraft usually include tricksters such as the coyote; however, it may include other creatures, usually those associated with death or bad omens. They might also possess living animals or people and walk around in their bodies. Skin-walkers may be male or female.

Skin-walker stories told among Navajo children may be complete life and death struggles that end in either skin-walker or Navajo killing the other, or partial encounter stories that end in a stalemate. Encounter stories may be composed as Navajo victory stories, with the skin-walkers approaching a hogan and being scared away.

Non-Native interpretations of skin-walker stories typically take the form of partial encounter stories on the road, where the protagonist is temporarily vulnerable, but then escapes from the skin-walker in a way not traditionally seen in Navajo stories. Sometimes Navajo children take European folk stories and substitute skin-walkers for generic killers like the Hook.

In popular culture
The skin-walker legend has inspired many modern video games and films. 

In mid-to-late 2020, the subject of skin-walkers became popular throughout various social media platforms, most notably TikTok. This trend depicted skin-walkers as creatures that disguise themselves as living things and make a poor attempt at mimicking their behavior. The trend sometimes involved pointing out people and animals acting oddly, suggesting that this behavior could mean that said person or animal was a skin-walker in disguise.

See also
Deer Woman
Huaychivo
Madam Koi Koi
Nagual
Skinwalker Ranch
Therianthropy
Warlock
Werewolf
Odiyan
Chupacabra
Mothman
Jersey Devil
Tikoloshe

References

External links
Why the Navajo Skinwalker is the Most Terrifying Native American Legend

Legendary creatures of the indigenous peoples of North America
Shapeshifters
Therianthropes
Supernatural legends
American witchcraft
Navajo mythology
Native American demons
Witchcraft in folklore and mythology